James Bell Bullitt (January 18, 1874 – March 7, 1964) was an American physician and a college football player and coach. He served as a player-coach at Washington and Lee University in Lexington, Virginia, in 1893.  Bullitt was born on January 18, 1874, in Louisville, Kentucky.  He earned a master's degree from Washington and Lee and a degree from the University of Virginia School of Medicine.   He taught at Virginia and the University of Mississippi before joining the faculty at the University of North Carolina School of Medicine as a professor of pathology in 1913.  Bullitt died at a nursing home, in Concord, Massachusetts, on March 7, 1964.

Head coaching record

References

External links
 
 Dr. James Bell Bullitt at the Bullitt History of Medicine Club, UNC School of Medicine

1874 births
1964 deaths
19th-century players of American football
20th-century American physicians
Player-coaches
Washington and Lee Generals football coaches
Washington and Lee Generals football players
University of North Carolina School of Medicine faculty
University of Virginia School of Medicine alumni
Sportspeople from Louisville, Kentucky
Coaches of American football from Kentucky
Players of American football from Louisville, Kentucky